Caroline Schultze (born Karola Szulc, 20 May 1866) was a Polish physician who worked in France.

Schultze was born in Warsaw, Congress Poland. Her father was a musician.

She gained a baccalaureat in 1884 and became a medical student at the University of Paris. In 1888, at the age of 22, she completed a doctoral thesis, "The Woman Physician in the Nineteenth Century." Schultze argued in the thesis that the achievements of women doctors were part of "a general movement of intellectual and professional emancipation for women" that had begun in the 1850s. Her thesis defense was controversial, with the neurologist Jean-Martin Charcot objecting to the "pretension" of Schultze's argument that medicine could be practiced ably by women as well as by men. However, the thesis was finally accepted, and Schultze won the doctorate.

Schultze's thesis was influential, inspiring a wave of dissertations by other French women scholars on women-related topics. It also inspired various novels about "new women," featuring women doctors and other professionals as protagonists and investigating the dilemma of balancing a career with family matters. Schultze was part of the flourishing of women's education in the later nineteenth century, as one of the thousands of women completing university degrees; she was also one of many women of her time who, having been barred from advanced training in their home countries, relocated to find it elsewhere.

In 1888, Schultze was one of the contributors to La Revue scientifique des femmes, a short-lived journal edited by the feminist activist Céline Renooz. Schultze later worked as the chief physician for women employees of La Poste, the French postal, telegraph and telephone service.

Schultze married the statistician Jacques Bertillon; they had two daughters.

References

Physicians from Warsaw
1866 births
French women physicians
19th-century French physicians
University of Paris alumni
Year of death missing
Polish emigrants to France
19th-century women physicians